Lucie Barma  is a Canadian freestyle skier. 

She won a bronze medal in ski ballet at the FIS Freestyle World Ski Championships 1986 in Tignes, and another bronze medal in ski ballet at the FIS Freestyle World Ski Championships 1989 in Oberjoch.

She took part in the 1988 Winter Olympics in Calgary, where ski ballet was a demonstration event.  Barma had 26 podium finishes including one gold medal at World Cup events over her career.

References

External links 
 

Year of birth missing (living people)
Living people
Canadian female freestyle skiers